The McCulloch Model MC-4 was an American tandem-rotor helicopter and was the first helicopter developed by McCulloch Aircraft Corporation, a division of McCulloch Motors Corporation. It was evaluated by the United States Army as the YH-30 and the United States Navy as the XHUM-1.

Design and development
The MC-4 was a larger version of the earlier HERC JOV-3 tandem-rotor helicopter and was developed by the McCulloch Aircraft Corporation. The JOV-3 was developed by Jovanovich when he headed the Helicopter Engineering and Research Corporation. The JOV-3 first flew in 1948. In 1949 Jovanovich moved to the McCulloch Motors Corporation where an enlarged helicopter the MC-4 first flew in March 1951. It was followed by a similar MC-4C and three evaluation helicopters for the United States Army (as the  YH-30). The MC-4C was slightly larger than the MC-4. When the MC-4C was certified in 1953 it was the first tandem-rotor helicopter to be certified in the United States for commercial use. Three examples were evaluated by the United States Army as the YH-30, but the Army's evaluation showed the helicopter to be underpowered.

The YH-30 had a steel tube framework with a light metal skin, A single 200  hp Franklin piston engine was horizontally mounted amidships and powered two intermeshing tandem rotors.  It had a fixed-wheel tricycle landing gear with a castering nosewheel.

No civil or military orders were received and Jovanovich formed his own company, the Jovair Corporation, where he modified the MC-4C as a prototype for a four-seat private helicopter designated the Sedan 4E. The Sedan 4E was powered by a 210 hp Franklin 6A-335 engine. A version with a turbocharged engine was designed as the Sedan 4ES and a more basic Sedan 4A for agricultural use. By 1965 a small number of Sedan helicopters were built. In the early 1970s, McCulloch regained the rights to the helicopter designs.

Variants

 McCulloch MC-4
 Prototype with a 165 hp Franklin engine, two built, one for evaluation by the United States Navy.
 McCulloch MC-4A
 Variant for evaluation by the United States Navy as the XHUM-1, two built.
 McCulloch MC-4C
 Prototype with a 200 hp Franklin engine, one built and an additional three for United States Army evaluation as the YH-30.
 Jovair Sedan 4E
 Production civil four-seat version powered by a 210 hp Franklin 6A-335 engine.
 Jovair Sedan 4ES
 Sedan with a turbocharged 225 hp Franklin engine.
 Jovair Sedan 4A
 Simplified agricultural version.

Military designations
 YH-30
 Military version of the MC-4C, three built.
 CHUM-1
 Two MC-4As for evaluation by the United States Navy, later redesignated HUM-1.

Operators

United States Army
United States Navy

Surviving aircraft

In 2008 two MC-4Cs were registered in the United States.

The Pima Air and Space Museum in Tucson, Arizona has HUM-1, Bureau Number 133817, civil registration N4072K.

The Yanks Air Museum in Chino, California has another HUM-1, Bureau Number 133818. Possibly N4091K.

N4071K was purchased by Jovanovich and Kozloski then upgraded to the newer Jovair-4E Sedan design. It is currently dismantled in Switzerland. It was also used in the 1954 science-fiction movie 'Gog' from Ivan Tors.

One of the three YH-30 military prototypes, c/n 001 with military serial number 52-5837, is preserved by the US Army Aviation Museum at Fort Rucker, Alabama. In December 2018, the aircraft had completed much of its restoration and by January 2019 it was on display at the Army Aviation Museum.

Specifications (YH-30)

References

 John Andrade, U.S.Military Aircraft Designations and Serials since 1909, Midland Counties Publications, 1979,  (Page 121)
 The Illustrated Encyclopedia of Aircraft (Part Work 1982-1985), 1985, Orbis Publishing, Page 2213/2214.

External links

 Jovair history

1950s United States experimental aircraft
Tandem rotor helicopters
1950s United States helicopters
Aircraft first flown in 1948
Single-engined piston helicopters